According to the annals of Shalmaneser I, discovered at Assur, an ancient Assyrian city on the Tigris and traditional capital of Assyria, near the modern city of Al-Shirqat in Iraq, he conquered eight countries in the northwest in his first year and destroyed the fortress of Arinnu, the dust of which he brought to Assur.

Ancient Assyrian cities